Rayner is a surname. Notable people with the surname include:

Amy Rayner (born 1977), English football referee
Angela Rayner, British Labour Party politician, trade unionist, Member of Parliament (MP) for Ashton-under-Lyne since 2015, Deputy leader of the Labour Party, Shadow First Secretary of State and Deputy leader of the Opposition since 2020
Billy Rayner (1935–2006), Australian rugby league player
Cameron Rayner (born 1999), Australian rules footballer
Chuck Rayner (1920–2002), Canadian professional hockey player
Claire Rayner (1931–2010), British journalist and agony aunt
Dave Rayner (born 1982), American professional football player
Denys Rayner (1908–1967), British sailor, writer, and designer of small boats
Eddie Rayner (born 1952), New Zealand musician
Henry Rayner (1902–1957), Australian and British artist
Isidor Rayner (1850–1912), United States Senator
Jack Rayner (1921–2008), Australian rugby league player
Jacqueline Rayner, British author and television writer
Jay Rayner (born 1966), British journalist, writer, and broadcaster
John Rayner (1924–2005), Rabbi CBE
Keith Rayner (bishop) (born 1929), Australian Anglican archbishop
Keith Rayner (psychologist), UC San Diego Professor of Psychology
Kenneth Rayner (1808–1884), U.S. Congressman
Kyle Rayner, fictional comic-book character
Lionel Benjamin Rayner (1788–1855), English actor
Louise Rayner (1832–1924), British watercolor artist
Mabel Rayner (c.1890-1948), English botanist
Margaret Rayner (1929–2019), British mathematician
Mark A. Rayner, Canadian author
Michael Rayner (1933–2015), British opera singer
Michael H. Rayner (1943–2004), Canadian accountant, Acting Auditor General of Canada
Moira Rayner (born 1948), New Zealand-born, Australian-based barrister and human rights advocate
Peter Alan Rayner (1924–2007), British coin-book author
Ray Rayner (1919–2004), American television performer
Rosalie Rayner (1898–1935), assistant and wife of psychologist John B. Watson
Walter Rayner, British football manager

Other uses
 Rayners Lane

See also
Rainer (disambiguation)
Rainier (disambiguation)
Rayne (disambiguation)
Raynor
Reiner (disambiguation)
Reyner
Raymond

English-language surnames